GRAM domain containing 1A also known as Aster-A is a protein that is encoded by the GRAMD1A gene.
  It contains a transmembrane region, a GRAM domain and a VASt domain that can bind cholesterol. GRAMD1A has four paralogs: GRAMD1B and GRAMD1C and two without VASt domains, GRAMD2A and GRAMD2B.  These proteins are mammalian representatives of the yeast lipid transfer proteins anchored at a membrane contact site (LAM) family.

The protein is expressed ubiquitously with higher levels in the central nervous system.

Function
GRAMD1A localizes to the endoplasmic reticulum.  Its GRAM domain tethers it to the plasma membrane where it can bind  phosphatidylinositol phosphate in areas enriched for it.

When the plasma membrane contains high levels of cholesterol, GRAMD1a like GRAMD1b and GRAMD1c moves to sites of contact between the plasma membrane and the endoplasmic reticulum. The VASt domain of GRAMD1A then binds cholesterol and cholesterol is moved from the plasma membrane to the endoplasmic reticulum.  The VASt domain is responsible for binding cholesterol while the GRAM domain determines the location of the protein through sensing of cholesterol and binding partially negatively charged lipids in the plasma membrane, especially phosphatidylserine.

GRAMD1A also is necessary for autophagosome biogenesis.

References

Further reading